Los się musi odmienić is an album by Kazik, released in 2005.

Track listing
 "Ból" (Pain)
 "DD"
 "Rozdroże" (Crossroads)
 "Los się musi odmienić" (The Fate Must Change)
 "W Polskę idziemy" (We're Going Forth Into Poland)
 "Mamo, przepraszam" (I'm Sorry, Mama)
 "Chlopci" (Bois) 
 "Gerard" (Gerhard)
 "Grześ" (Georgie)
 "To jest chiba apokalipsa" (Tis Gotta Be Sum Apocalypse) 
 "Alicja!" (Alice!)
 "Co się stało z naszem panem?" (What Happened To Ouer Lord?) 
 "Generał Poder" (General Poder)
 "Frankie & Johnny"
 "Brat gryzie ziemię" (Brother Bites the Dust)
 "Jeszcze Polska nie zginęła" (Poland Is Not Yet Lost)

2005 albums
Kazik Staszewski albums